Hyllus or Hyllos was the ancient name of a river of Asia Minor. It is a tributary of the river Hermus, in Lydia, flowing into Hermus from the north. In the time of Strabo, the river was called Phrygius.

Citations

References

Geography of ancient Lydia
History of Turkey